George Alexander "Shorty" Horne (June 27, 1904 — July 31, 1929) was a Canadian ice hockey right winger who played three seasons in the National Hockey League from 1925 to 1929 for the Montreal Maroons and Toronto Maple Leafs.

In 54 career NHL games, he scored nine goals and assisted on three for twelve points. He won a Stanley Cup with the Maroons in 1926. George's name was left off the Stanley Cup, because he did not play in the playoffs. Horne died in the off-season in 1929 when he drowned while on a canoe with some friends.

Career statistics

Regular season and playoffs

See also
 List of ice hockey players who died during their playing career

External links
 

1904 births
1929 deaths
Canadian ice hockey forwards
Deaths by drowning in Canada
Ice hockey people from Ontario
Montreal Maroons players
Niagara Falls Cataracts players
Sportspeople from Greater Sudbury
Stanley Cup champions
Stratford Nationals players
Toronto Maple Leafs players